Krista Parkkonen (born 25 June 2002) is a Finnish ice hockey player and member of the Finnish national team, currently playing with the Vermont Catamounts women's ice hockey program in the Hockey East (HEA) conference of the NCAA Division I.

She will represent Finland at the 2022 IIHF Women's World Championship.

Playing career
She played on girls' teams for a few years. Early on, she set her sights on playing for the national team and having a college ice hockey career in the United States, which prompted her to switch to playing with the boys' teams for her age group in the junior ice hockey department of SaiPa. At age fifteen, she made her debut with SaiPa Naiset, the club's representative women's team in the third-tier Naisten Suomi-sarja but, as the women's team was not very competitive, she continued to spend most of her time playing on the boys' junior teams.

After turning seventeen and becoming ineligible to play in boys' leagues any longer, Parkkonen was recruited to play for newly-created women's team HIFK Naiset by general manager and head coach Saara Niemi.

Career statistics

International

Awards and honors

See also 

 List of Finnish women in North American collegiate ice hockey

References

External links
 

2002 births
Living people
Finnish expatriate ice hockey players in the United States
Finnish women's ice hockey defencemen
HIFK Naiset players
People from Lappeenranta
Sportspeople from South Karelia
Vermont Catamounts women's ice hockey players